Pall mall, paille maille, palle malle, etc., may refer to:

 Pall-mall, a lawn game related to croquet, the source of later uses

Places
 Pall Mall, London, a street in the City of Westminster, London
 Pall Mall, a long-running farm near Tywyn, Gwynedd, Wales, named after the London street
 Pall Mall, Tennessee, a small unincorporated community in Fentress County, Tennessee
 Pall Mall (Bendigo), urban downtown area of Bendigo, Australia

Media
 The Pall Mall Gazette, an evening newspaper founded in London on 7 February 1865
 The Pall Mall Magazine, a monthly British literary magazine published between 1893 and 1914

Sports
 Pall Mall (horse) (1955–1978), horse that won the 2000 Guineas Stakes in 1958
 Pall Mall Stakes, a prestigious greyhound racing competition

Other
 Pall Mall (cigarette), a brand of cigarettes produced by R. J. Reynolds Tobacco Company
 Pall Mall Restaurant, a hostelry on Cockspur Street, Westminster, London
 Pall mall, a cocktail with gin

See also
 30 Pall Mall, an office building approved for construction in the commercial district of Liverpool, England
 Pale Male (born 1990), red-tailed hawk that lives in New York City
 Pell Mell (disambiguation)